Belawadi  is a village in the southern state of Karnataka, India. It is located in the Bailhongal taluk of Belgaum district in Karnataka.

Demographics

 India census, Belawadi had a population of 8061 with 4089 males and 3972 females.

See also
 Belgaum
 Districts of Karnataka

References

External links
 

Villages in Belagavi district